Lutz Hachmeister (born 10 September 1959) is a German media historian, award-winning filmmaker and journalist. He particularly gained international attention for directing the 2005 film The Goebbels Experiment, co-produced by the BBC and the Canadian History channel, and featuring Kenneth Branagh as the narrator for the Goebbels Diaries. In 2006 Hachmeister established the Institute for Media and Communication Policy (IfM) in Berlin and Cologne, which is strongly tied to the Anglo-American media scene.

Academic career
Hachmeister was born in Minden/Westphalia. He graduated from the University of Münster, writing his doctoral thesis about the history of communication research in Germany. His professorial thesis (Habilitation) deals with Franz Six, Adolf Eichmann's superior, who was nominated to rule Great Britain as the head of the SD (Security Service of the Nazi paramilitary force SS) in case of a German occupation. Hachmeister's book about Six's career was widely recognized as one of the "new biographies" in the 1990s, describing in detail the mentality and role of the young academic elite in shaping the "Third Reich".

Contrary to current trends in media studies and communication research, Hachmeister's "konkrete Kommunikationsforschung" (concrete communication research) relies heavily on the classical socio-psychological models in US communication studies (Harold Dwight Lasswell, Robert Ezra Park). He also frequently refers to the Canadian communication theory and the German decisionist law professor Carl Schmitt.

Professional career
As a journalist, Hachmeister worked for several leading German newspapers, such as Der Tagesspiegel, Die Woche and Süddeutsche Zeitung. He is also associate professor for journalism at the University of Dortmund. His research on former Nazi intelligence specialists in the formative years of Germany's leading news magazine Der Spiegel aroused a debate about the history of the paper, which was usually considered to have pure leftist-liberal traditions. Hachmeister's documentary about the life and death of Hanns Martin Schleyer, the former head of the German employers association, who was murdered in 1977 by the Red Army Faction, won a Grimme-Award (Germany's most prestigious television prize) in 2004. The following year, The Goebbels Experiment premiered at the Berlin film festival und was selected as a New York Times critics' pick.

Hachmeister currently heads the Institute for Media and Communication Policy and is considered to be "Germany's leading media expert" (Berliner Zeitung, 21 July 1997). The Institute is particularly known for its high-ranking media colloquia, which host international guests like Alan Rusbridger, Greg Dyke or Norman Pearlstine. Hachmeister is also the founder of the Cologne Conference, a "media Bauhaus" and festival for aesthetic and strategic trends in the audiovisual industry.

Selected films
2017 "Wallraff war hier" (biographical documentary about German undercover journalist Günter Wallraff)
2015 "Der Hannover-Komplex" (documentary about the rise of the city of Hanover as a political powerhouse in Germany)
2011 The Real American - Joe McCarthy (docudrama, starring John Sessions, Justine Waddell and Trystan Gravelle)
2010 Three Stars ("Die Köche und die Sterne", TV documentary)
2008 Revolution! Das Jahr 1968 (Revolution! The Year 1968, documentary with Stefan Aust)
2008 Freundschaft! – Die Freie Deutsche Jugend (Friendship, documentary about the Free German Youth organization in the former German Democratic Republic)
2007 Baie des Milliardaires (Bay of Billionaires, documentary about the Cap d'Antibes)
2005 The Goebbels Experiment (documentary, narrated by Kenneth Branagh)
2004 Schleyer. Eine deutsche Geschichte. (Schleyer – The Business of Terror, documentary)
2000 Hotel Provençal. Aufstieg und Fall der Riviera. (Documentary about the rise and fall of the hotel at the French Riviera)
1997/98 mondän! (TV series about the posh places of the 1960s like Deauville, Portofino, Saint Tropez)

Selected bibliography
Hôtel Provençal. Eine Geschichte der Côte d‘Azur. Munich, C. Bertelsmann 2021
Hannover. Ein deutsches Machtzentrum, Munich, DVA 2016
Heideggers Testament. Der Philosoph, der Spiegel und die SS, Berlin, Propyläen 2014
Grundlagen der Medienpolitik: Ein Handbuch. Munich, DVA 2008
Nervöse Zone: Politik und Journalismus in der Berliner Republik. Munich, DVA 2007
Wer beherrscht die Medien? Die 50 größten Medienkonzerne der Welt.4th ed., Munich, Beck 2005 (edited with Günther Rager)
Schleyer. Eine deutsche Geschichte. Beck, Munich 2004
Der Gegnerforscher. Die Karriere des SS-Führers Franz Alfred Six. Munich, Beck 1998
Theoretische Publizistik. Studien zur Geschichte der Kommunikationswissenschaft in Deutschland. Berlin, Wissenschaftsverlag Spiess 1987

Footnotes

External links

Institut für Medien- und Kommunikationspolitik 
International Media Database 

1959 births
German documentary film directors
German journalists
German male journalists
People from Minden
Media historians
Living people
German male writers
Mass media people from North Rhine-Westphalia